Melissa Caddle (born 3 September 1992) is a Guyanese sprinter. She competed in the 400 metres event at the 2014 IAAF World Indoor Championships.

References

1992 births
Living people
Guyanese female sprinters
Place of birth missing (living people)